Hope School District or Hope Public Schools is a school district in Hempstead County, Arkansas, headquartered in Hope. It serves Hope, Guernsey, Fulton, Oakhaven, Patmos, Perrytown, and Washington.

History
In 1966 the Guernsey School District merged into the Hope School District.

In 1979 the Patmos School District merged into the Hope School District.

The Washington School District was dissolved on July 1, 1990. A portion of its territory was given to the Hope district.

Schools
 Hope High School
 Yerger Middle School
 Beryl Henry Elementary School
 William Jefferson Clinton Primary School

Other:
 Academy of Public Service
 Garland Learning Center

References

Further reading
  (Download)

External links
 
 

School districts in Arkansas
Education in Hempstead County, Arkansas